Boswell is a town in Choctaw County, Oklahoma, United States.  The population was 709 at the 2010 census.

History 
The Boswell area was one of the Choctaw Nation's first and most important settlements.  A Presbyterian missionary station was founded at Mayhew, Indian Territory, three miles north of present-day Boswell in the 1840s.  It soon became a government center as well as seat of civilization.  Mayhew became the administrative and judicial capital of the Pushmataha District, one of three administrative super-regions comprising the  Choctaw Nation.

Mayhew was located in Blue County, one of the counties comprising the Pushmataha District.  In 1886 portions of Blue County, including Mayhew, were joined with parts of adjacent counties to form Jackson County.  The new county's seat of government was at Pigeon Roost, south of Boswell.

A United States Post Office was established at Mayhew, Indian Territory on February 5, 1845 and operated until September 30, 1902.  It then moved two miles south to Boswell, which was then a new townsite along the new railroad, and changed its name to Boswell.

Boswell was named for S.C. Boswell, a local merchant.

Geography

The town contains Boswell State Park, an Oklahoma State Park largely occupied by a lake, which has been stocked with channel catfish.

Climate

Demographics

As of the 2010 United States Census, there were 709 people, 295 households, and 184 families residing in the town. There were 370 housing units at an average density of X per square mile (X/km2). The racial makeup of the town was 63.33% white, 18.05% Native American, 8.32% African American, 2.68% from other races, and 7.33% from two or more races. Hispanic or Latino individuals were 5.92% of the population in 2010, having more than doubled since 2000.

There were 295 households, out of which 34.6% had children under the age of 18 living with them, 34.9% were married couples living together, 19.3% had a female householder with no husband present, and 37.6% were non-families. A third (34.6%) of households were made up of individuals, and 15.3% had someone living alone who was 65 years of age or older. The average household size was 2.4 and the average family size was 3.04.

In the town, the population was spread out, with 25.8% under the age of 18, 11.2% from 18 to 24, 21.3% from 25 to 44, 25.6% from 45 to 64, and 16.1% who were 65 years of age or older.  The median age was 36.6 years.  For every 100 females, there were 87.6 males.  For every 100 females age 18 and over, there were X males.

The median income for a household in the town was $20,917, and the median income for a family was $27,300.  Males had a median income of $20,000 versus $17,292 for females.  The per capita income for the town was $13,523.  An estimated 35.8% of families and 39.2% of the population were below the poverty line, including 64.9% of those under age 18 and 14.4% of those age 65 or over.

References

External links

 Two Lane Blacktop: Return to Boswell
 Encyclopedia of Oklahoma History and Culture - Boswell

Towns in Choctaw County, Oklahoma
Towns in Oklahoma
State parks of Oklahoma